Moschochori (until 1927 , Vambeli);; was a small village in the community of Krystallopigi, Greece. Its population was 488 at the 1940 census.

History 
The village is mentioned for the first time in an Ottoman defter from 1530 under the name Vimbil. The term means "spring" in different Bulgarian dialects. It has a church dating from 1871. During Ottoman rule the Orthodox congregation was included in ethno-religious community under Graeco-Byzantine domination and all Orthodox Greeks, Bulgarians, Albanians, Vlachs and Serbs, were considered part of the same community in spite of their differences in ethnicity and language. With the rise of nationalism under the Ottoman Empire during the 19th century the Rum millet began to degrade with the continuous identification of the religious creed with ethnic nationality. The national awakening of each ethnic group inside it was complex and most of the groups interacted with each other. In the late 19th century, competition arose between Greeks and Bulgarians over the village. Initially the conflict was waged through educational and religious propaganda, with a fierce rivalry developing between supporters of the Ecumenical Patriarchate of Constantinople, who identified as Greek, and supporters of the Bulgarian Exarchate, which had been established by the Ottomans in 1870. Under these conditions, in the early 20th century a vicious guerrilla war broke between Bulgarian and Greek bands within the area.

In the book "Ethnography of the vilayets of Adrianople, Monastir and Salonika ", published in Constantinople in 1878, that reflected the statistics of the male population of 1873, Moschohori (Vembel) is listed as a village with 150 households with 420 inhabitants Bulgarians. According to Al. Synvet ("Les Grecs de l'Empire Ottoman. Étude Statistique et Ethnographique") in 1878 in Moschohori (Vambeli) lived 600 Greeks. In 1889 Stefan Verkovich (Топографическо-этнографическій очеркъ Македоніи“) wrote that the village had 135 Bulgarian families with 656 inhabitants. According to statistics of Vasil Kanchov ("Macedonia. Ethnography and statistics") in 1900 Vambel had 650 inhabitants all Bulgarians. According to the secretary of the Bulgarian Exarchate Dimitar Mishev ("La Macédoine et sa Population Chrétienne") in 1905 in Moschohori (Vambel) lived 960 Bulgarians Exarchists. During the Ilinden uprising Vambel was burned from the Ottomans. After the uprising, the Balkan Wars and the First World War part of the population gradually took refuge in Bulgaria. In 1936 the population was 680 people.

During the Second World War here was founded a subdivision of the pro-Bulgarian Ohrana. It was heavily destroyed during the Greek civil war (1946–1949) and afterwards the rest of its population emigrated to different Communist countries: Soviet Union, Bulgaria, Poland, Czechoslovakia, Yugoslavia and the village was practically depopulated.

Notable people
Pando Andreev (1878–?) Bulgarian volunteer from Macedonian-Adrianopolitan Volunteer Corps
Zissis Papachristos, Greek priest and Macedonian fighter
Mito Atanasov (1890–?) Bulgarian volunteer from Macedonian-Adrianopolitan Volunteer Corps
Lazaros Potsis, Greek Macedonian fighter
Ilija Digalov (1890–1922) Bulgarian Internal Macedonian Revolutionary Organization revolutionary
Naoum Rolos, Greek Macedonian fighter
Socrat Lafazanovski (1939–) Artist, North Macedonia
priest Christos, Greek priest & Macedonian fighter, killed by Bulgarians
Socrat Panovski (1948–) Politician, North Macedonia
Jani Lukarov (1922–1948) Macedonian partisan
Stavros Stavropoulos, Greek Macedonian fighter
Andrew Rossos (1941–) Macedonian Canadian historian

Notes
7.Сократ Пановски. „В'мбел“. Скопје, 2001.

Populated places in Florina (regional unit)
Former populated places in Greece